LRR may refer to:
Laminated root rot, a root disease in conifers
Leucine-rich repeat, a type of protein domain
LoadingReadyRun, a Canadian comedy troupe
 Long Range Radar
 Long River Review, a literary magazine of the University of Connecticut
Low rolling resistance tires, a type of tires designed for fuel efficiency
 Light Reaction Regiment, the Philippine Army counter-terrorist unit modeled after the U.S. Army Delta Force and British SAS
 Loose Round Robin, Warp Scheduling

See also
 LR (disambiguation)
 Lrrr (disambiguation)